Sape, SAPE, Sapë, or Sapé may refer to:

People
 Janet Sape (died 2017), businesswoman from Papua New Guinea
 Lauvale Sape, (born 1980), American football player

Places
 Roman Catholic Diocese of Sapë, Albania
 Sapé, Paraíba, a municipality in Brazil
 Sape, a municipality in Albania officially known as Vau i Dejës
 Sape Strait, Indonesia

Education and organizations
 La Sape (Société des Ambianceurs et des Personnes Élégantes), a social movement centered in Brazzaville, Republic of Congo
 , an ecological organization
 Society of Avian Paleontology and Evolution, an international scientific society dedicated to the study of the evolution of birds; see Sapeornis

Other uses
 French destroyer Sape
 Sapé language, a nearly extinct language spoken in Venezuela
 Sape, a synonym for the Sarangesa genus of butterfly
 Sape' or sapeh, a traditional lute in Borneo
 SAPE, the stock symbol for Sapient Corporation

See also
 Sapa (disambiguation)